This is a list of Kenyan writers.

A
 Justus Kiprono (2019–)
 Abdilatif Abdalla (1946–)
 Carolyne Adalla
 Jared Angira (1947–), poet
 Jonah Anguka
 Khadambi Asalache (1934–), poet and author

C
 Rocha Chimera, Swahili author and critic

D
 Hazel de Silva Mugot (1947–), novelist
 Ghalib Shiraz Dhalla

G
 Mugo Gatheru (1925–2011), autobiographical writer
 Muga Gicaru (c. 1920– ), novelist, real name as John Mwengi
 Moraa Gitaa, author, novelist, short story writer, 2010 Penguin Prize for African Writing nominee, 2008

I
 Francis Imbuga (1947–2012), director and playwright

K
 Samuel Kahiga, short story writer and novelist
 Joseph Elijah Kariuki (1931–1975), poet
 Amin Kassam (1948–), journalist and poet
 Jomo Kenyatta (1892?–1978), politician and writer 
 Leonard Kibera (1942–1983), novelist and short story writer 
 Wanjiru Kihoro (1953–2006), journalist, writer, academic, activist; produced Kenya News in the 1980s from London
 John Kiriamiti (1950–), writer of popular fiction
 Henry Ole kulet (1950–), 
 Kinyanjui Kombani (1981–), writer of popular fiction

L
 Muthoni Likimani (1926–)
 Jeff Lumiri (2015–), author, poet, and novelist

M
 Marjorie Oludhe Macgoye (1928–2015), novelist, essayist and poet
 Charles Mangua (c.1940–), fiction writer
 Anne Matindi (1942–), children's writer
 Ali A. Mazrui (1933–2014), academic and political writer 
 John Samuel Mbiti (1931–), poet and writer on religion
 Miguna Miguna
 Parmenas Githendu Mockerie (1900?–?), writer
 Mwana Kupona binti Msham (died c.1865), Swahili poet
 Micere Mugo (1942–), playwright, academic and poet
 James Ngugi
 Mũkoma wa Ngũgĩ (1971–)
 Ben Mutua Jonathan Muriithi, a.k.a. BMJ Muriithi, US-based Kenyan journalist, works for VOA (US) and NTV (Kenya)
 Joseph Muthee (1928–), Kikuyu writer
 Meja Mwangi (1948–), novelist
 Gitura Mwaura, development writer and journalist

N
 Rebecca Nandwa, Swahili children's writer
 Alexander Nderitu (1979–), novelist, scriptwriter and Kenyan e-book and Print on Demand pioneer
 Mona L. Nduilu (1976–)
 Stephen N. Ngubiah (1936–), novelist
 Ngugi wa Mirii (1951–2008), playwright
 Ngũgĩ wa Thiong'o (1938–), English-language and Gikuyu writer 
 Rebeka Njau (1932–), novelist, playwright and poet  
 Chacha Nyaigotti-Chacha (1952–), playwright
 Njeri Simon Gichimu (Kiswahili and children's story writer, Jomo and the Wild Cats)

O
 Asenath Bole Odaga (1937–2014), publisher and author
 Atieno Odhiambo (1945–2009), academic
 Oginga Odinga (1912–1994), writer, philosopher and politician 
 Margaret Ogola (1958–2011)
 Grace Ogot (1930–2015), writer and politician  
 Makena Onjerika, winner of the Caine Prize 2018
 Troy Onyango (1993–), writer
 Dominic Owuor Otiang'a (1987–), author, novelist
 Yvonne Adhiambo Owuor (1968–), winner of the Caine Prize 2003

P
 Shailja Patel, poet, playwright and activist
 Paul Kipchumba (1983–), poet and prose writer

R
 Mwangi Ruheni (1934–), scientist and popular novelist

V
 M. G. Vassanji (1950–), novelist and editor
 Iman Verjee
 Vincent de Paul (1986–), novelist, editor, publisher, and creative writing tutor

W
 Wanuri Kahiu (1980–), film director, producer and writer
 Wangui wa Goro (1961–), academic and translator
 Koigi wa Wamwere (1949–), politician and writer
 Godwin Wachira (1936–), novelist
 Charity Waciuma (1936–), novelist
 Binyavanga Wainaina (1971–2019), founder and editor of Kwani?, winner of the Caine Prize 2002
 Gakaara Wanjau (1921–2001), writer and Gikuyu nationalist
 Kenneth Watene (1944–), playwright
 Miriam Were (1940–), public health advocate, academic and novelist
 Wanjiru Koinange, writer, restorer of libraries and entrepreneur

References

Kenyan
Writers
List